The Floyd County School District was founded in 1888 and is a public school district in Floyd County, Georgia, United States. Its headquarters has a Rome postal address but lies outside of the Rome city limits.

It serves the communities in the county outside of the city of Rome. They include Cave Spring, Lindale, Livingston, Mount Berry, Shannon, and Silver Creek.

It is also the public school district serving the faculty housing on the property of Berry College.

Rome City School District serves areas in the Rome city limits.

Schools
The Floyd County School District has six elementary schools, two primary schools, three middle schools, and four high schools.

Elementary schools 
Alto Park Elementary School
Armuchee Elementary School
Cave Spring Elementary School (closed May 2022)
Garden Lakes Elementary School
Johnson Elementary School
Model Elementary School
Pepperell Elementary School

Primary schools
Pepperell Primary School
Glenwood Primary School (closed May 2022)
Armuchee Primary School (opened August 2022)

Middle schools
Armuchee Middle School (closed May 2022, building transitioned to Armuchee Elementary School in August 2022)
Coosa Middle School
Model Middle School
Pepperell Middle School

High schools
Armuchee High School
Coosa High School
Model High School
Pepperell High School

System programs
Floyd County Schools College & Career Academy

Former schools
McHenry Primary School - Rome postal address
In 2018 McHenry Primary had approximately 100 enrolled, making it the district's school with the lowest enrollment. The district analyzed demographic trends which showed a projected further decrease in students. In 2018 the board of education agreed to close the school. The closure was to be effective summer 2019, and the former McHenry was to house Pepperell Primary students while Pepperell Middle School students would temporarily occupy Pepperell Primary School while the middle school was demolished and rebuilt.

Reports of Racism
Reports of racism by teachers and some white students at Coosa High School against African-American students, and the refusal of the Floyd County School District to take action against the racist behavior have resulted in the school district and board of education in Floyd County being sued by the students and mothers of the students. The lawsuit also cites the incident of students wearing Black Lives Matter T-shirts have been suspended, despite the fact the school has taken no action against racist students who used racial slurs against African-American students who carried the Confederate flag on school grounds at Coosa High School.

See also

References

External links

School districts in Georgia (U.S. state)
Education in Floyd County, Georgia
School districts established in 1888
1888 establishments in Georgia (U.S. state)